M'Semrir is a commune in Tinghir Province of the Drâa-Tafilalet administrative region of Morocco. At the time of the 2004 census, the commune had a total population of 8107 people living in 1097 households.

References

Populated places in Tinghir Province
Rural communes of Drâa-Tafilalet